Jennifer Cramer (born 24 February 1993) is a German footballer. She plays for 1. FFC Turbine Potsdam in the Frauen Bundesliga.

Honours

Club
1. FFC Turbine Potsdam
UEFA Women's Champions League Runner-up: 2010–11
Frauen-Bundesliga Winners: 2010–11, 2011–12
DFB-Pokal Runners-up: 2010–11, 2012–13
 Women's Under-17 Championship Winners: 2008–2009, 2009–2010

International
Germany
UEFA Women's Championship Winner: 2013
FIFA U-20 Women's World Cup Runner-up: 2012
UEFA Women's U-19 Championship Winner: 2011
UEFA Women's U-17 Championship Winner: 2009
Algarve Cup: Winner 2014

References

External links
 
 
 Profile  at DFB
 Player German domestic football stats  at DFB
 

1993 births
Living people
German women's footballers
1. FFC Turbine Potsdam players
Germany women's international footballers
2015 FIFA Women's World Cup players
People from Waldeck-Frankenberg
Sportspeople from Kassel (region)
Women's association football midfielders
Women's association football defenders
UEFA Women's Championship-winning players
Footballers from Hesse
Frauen-Bundesliga players